Królewo Malborskie  is a village in the administrative district of Gmina Stare Pole, within Malbork County, Pomeranian Voivodeship, in northern Poland.

22nd Air Base of the Polish Air Force is located nearby.

The village has a population of 210.

References

Villages in Malbork County